Margaret Anne Mary Mundy (January 4, 1915 – January 12, 2016) was an English-born American actress and model. She was born in London,  and in 1921, at the age of six, emigrated to the United States with her family.

Personal life
Mundy was born in Marylebone, London. Her mother, Australian opera singer Clytie Hine, studied at the Elder Conservatorium of Music in Adelaide, South Australia. Her father was English cellist John Mundy.  In 1921, the couple emigrated to the United States with their two children. Their father became orchestra manager of the Metropolitan Opera. After retiring as a performer, Hine coached opera singers and musical performers. Meg's younger brother was Columbia University history professor John Hine Mundy. Mundy celebrated her 100th birthday on January 4, 2015, and died on January 12, 2016, at the age of 101.

Marriages
 Marc Daniels (1942–51; divorced)
 Konstantinos "Dino" Yannopoulos (September 15, 1951–?; divorced); 1 child

Career
In 1940, modeling agency founder Harry Conover cited Mundy as one of the 10 top models ("those who lure the highest salaries"). A newspaper article two years later reported that Mundy was "said to be Manhattan's highest paid model."

Mundy debuted as a concert singer at Carnegie Hall in 1942.

In 1948 Mundy starred in The Respectful Prostitute (see below), but Dorothy Parker professed ignorance: "Meg Mundy? What's that, a Welsh holiday?" (Film star Ann Dvorak succeeded Mundy in that role.) Mundy also played Mary McLeod, the lead female role, in the Broadway production of Detective Story.

On television she played, among other roles, an antiques fancier on an episode of Alfred Hitchcock Presents, and wealthy matriarch Mona Aldrich Croft on The Doctors from 1972 to 1973 and 1975–82, leaving 3 months before the show ended.
After playing the role of Isabelle Alden on the pilot for the new soap Loving, she briefly played Maeve Stoddard's imperious mother Julia on Guiding Light. She later played the role of Dimitri Marrick's wealthy aunt, Eugenia von Voynavitch on All My Children.

Her film credits included roles in Eyes of Laura Mars (1978), Oliver's Story (1978), The Bell Jar (1979), and as the mother of Mary Tyler Moore's character in Ordinary People (1980), which won the Academy Award as Best Picture Of The Year. She appeared in the 1983 Walter Matthau-Robin Williams film The Survivors, the 1987 films Fatal Attraction and Someone to Watch Over Me, and in two episodes of Law & Order in the 1990s.

Awards
In 1948 Mundy won the Theatre World Award for her performance in The Respectful Prostitute at the Cort Theatre.

In 1982 she was nominated for a Daytime Emmy award for Outstanding Supporting Actress in a Daytime Drama Series at the 9th Daytime Emmy Awards for her role on The Doctors.

Filmography

References

External links

 

1915 births
2016 deaths
American centenarians
American film actresses
American soap opera actresses
American stage actresses
American television actresses
American people of Australian descent
Actresses from New York City
English centenarians
English film actresses
English soap opera actresses
English stage actresses
English television actresses
English people of Australian descent
British emigrants to the United States
Actresses from London
Theatre World Award winners
Women centenarians
21st-century American women